Andres Bonifacio College (ABCollege or ABC) is a community college institution in the Philippines. Its campus is located at College Park, Brgy. Miputak, Dipolog. ABCollege offers course programs from kindergarten to postgraduate levels. Alumni and students of the college are referred to as Bonifacians.

History

Andres Bonifacio College was founded in 1940 as Andres Bonifacio Institute by Amando B. Amatong and Felicidad S. Amatong. The college was named after Andres Bonifacio, a revolutionary leader, to which Amando himself found inspiration being born to poverty in Dalaguete, Cebu. The original location of ABI used to be in what is now Festival Shopping Arcade 1 in Rizal Avenue corner Magsaysay Street, Barangay Central.

Amando Amatong died on April 21, 1943, leaving his wife Felicidad to operate the institute while taking care of their eight young children. To maintain ABI's operation, Amando's youngest brother Silverio B. Amatong was appointed as the institute's president. From its original campus used since its founding, the college permanently transferred to what it is now known as College Park in Barangay Miputak after a fire razed the institute's buildings and nearby structures to the ground in 1968.

Student life

Student Publication
The official student publication of the college is The Bonifacio Standard, while the student publication for the college's elementary department is The Alphabet Soup.

Broadcasting
ABCollege operates a number of radio stations across Mindanao under its media arm Andres Bonifacio College Broadcasting System, established on July 16, 1995.

Newspaper
The Mindanao Observer, founded in 1965, is a bilingual (English and Cebuano), bi-weekly newspaper in circulation in the provinces of Zamboanga del Norte, Zamboanga del Sur, and Zamboanga Sibugay. Despite being connected with the college, it operates as a separate entity with the Andres Bonifacio College Press as its publisher. It is said to cease newspaper publication and/or moved online due to the impact of the COVID-19 pandemic in the Philippines.

Notable Bonifacians
Isagani S. Amatong (LL. B., 1970) - former Provincial Governor (1986-1995; 1998–2004), and current Congressman of the 3rd District of Zamboanga del Norte (2013–present)
Zorro Aguilar - lawyer, activist, newspaper editor, and martial law victim.
Athalia Briones Liong (LL. B., 2016) - lawyer for the Office of the Solicitor General, and Top 3 in the 2016 Philippine Bar Examinations

References

External links
 

Dipolog
Education in Dipolog
Educational institutions established in 1940
1940 establishments in the Philippines
Universities and colleges in Zamboanga del Norte